The 1947 Washington Huskies football team was an American football team that represented the University of Washington as a member of the Pacific Coast Conference (PCC) during the 1947 college football season. In its sixth season under head coach Ralph Welch, the team compiled a 3–6 record (2–5 against PCC opponents), finished seventh in the PCC, and was outscored by a total of 99 to 98. Gail Bruce was the team captain.

Schedule

Professional football draft selections
Three University of Washington Huskies were selected in the 1948 NFL Draft, which lasted 32 rounds with 300 selections.
The same three Huskies were also selected in the 1948 AAFC Draft, which lasted 30 rounds with 217 selections.

References

Washington
Washington Huskies football seasons
Washington Huskies football